The Judge Dredd Roleplaying Game is a science fiction role-playing game published by Mongoose Publishing in 2002 and 2009. It is based on Judge Dredd from 2000 AD comic.

Publication history
In 2002, Mongoose Publishing having acquired the rights to publish games set in the worlds created by 2000AD, released The Judge Dredd Roleplaying Game. Based on the d20 System, they published a total of 15 supplements. It was also supported by their in-house magazine, Signs & Portents.

In 2009, Mongoose released a new edition, using their Traveller rules set. It was announced that their license was ending in late 2016.

Reception
In a review of The Judge Dredd Roleplaying Game in Black Gate, Robert Rowe said "Overall, if you like Judge Dredd and don't absolutely hate the Traveller rules system, this is an excellent game packed with key information and well-laid out stats, all bound together in a very slick package."

Reviews
Pyramid

References

External links
Mongoose's page for their game 
2000AD profile for the Mongoose game
RPGGeek page for the game

British role-playing games
D20 System
Games based on Judge Dredd
Mongoose Publishing games
Role-playing games based on comics
Role-playing games introduced in 2002
Science fiction role-playing games